See This Through and Leave is the debut album by the Cooper Temple Clause.

It was released as a CD, a limited edition double CD, an international CD, and a 7" boxed set, along with two promo CDs.

The title of the album comes from a lyric in the track "Murder Song".

The liner notes give 'thanks' to Five and Westlife "for their ongoing financial support". This is a humorous reference to the fact that the Cooper Temple Clause shared a record label with the two popular boy bands, who could be seen to have helped finance this album.

The album reached No. 27 on the UK Albums Chart.

Track listing

CD one
 "Did You Miss Me?" - 4:40
 "Film-Maker" - 2:57
 "Panzer Attack" - 4:01
 "Who Needs Enemies?" - 4:52
 "Amber" - 5:07
 "Digital Observations" - 7:14
 "Let's Kill Music" - 4:13
 "555-4823" - 4:54
 "Been Training Dogs" - 3:13
 "The Lake" - 5:23
 "Murder Song" - 8:47

The international CD contains an extra track, "Safe Enough Distance Away".

Bonus disc
 "Devil Walks in the Sand"
 "Way Out West"
 "I'll Still Write"
 "Panzer Attack" (live)
 "Let's Kill Music" (live)

References

2002 debut albums
The Cooper Temple Clause albums